Anzal may refer to the following places in Iran:

 Anzal, Kermanshah
 Anzal District, in West Azerbaijan Province
 Anzal-e Jonubi Rural District, in West Azerbaijan Province
 Anzal-e Shomali Rural District, in West Azerbaijan Province

See also